Lachine—Lac-Saint-Louis was a federal electoral district in Quebec, Canada, that was represented in the House of Commons of Canada from 1988 to 1997.

This riding was created in 1987 from  Lachine and Notre-Dame-de-Grâce—Lachine East ridings. The electoral district was abolished in 1996 and redistributed between Lac-Saint-Louis and Notre-Dame-de-Grâce—Lachine ridings. 

Lachine—Lac-Saint-Louis consisted of the City of Dorval, and the towns of Beaconsfield, Ile-Dorval, Lachine and Pointe-Claire.

Members of Parliament

This riding elected the following Members of Parliament:

Election results

See also 

 List of Canadian federal electoral districts
 Past Canadian electoral districts

External links 
 Riding history from the Library of Parliament

Former federal electoral districts of Quebec